Waiting Alone is a 2004 Chinese romantic comedy film written & directed by Chinese-American filmmaker Dayyan Eng, depicting the lives of a group of hip, affluent, twenty-something Beijing residents. The film features Chinese movie stars Xia Yu, Gong Beibi and Li Bingbing. It also features cameos of some of Hong Kong's best known actors, including Chow Yun-fat.

Excellent reviews and strong word-of-mouth made this independent film a hit in China where it was embraced by young audiences. In 2005, Waiting Alone was nominated for three Chinese Academy Awards (Golden Rooster Awards) including Best Picture; the first time a nomination was awarded to a foreign director in this category. Waiting Alone was acquired for international distribution in 2006 by Arclight Films.

Cast
 Xia Yu
 Li Bingbing
 Gong Beibi
 Dayyan Eng
 Yuan Quan
 Chow Yun-fat

Awards 
Best Picture Nomination - 2005 Golden Rooster Awards
Best Actress Nomination - 2005 Golden Rooster Awards
Best Art Direction Nomination - 2005 Golden Rooster Awards
Best First Feature Award - 2005 Beijing Film Festival
Best Actor Award - 2005 Beijing Film Festival
 Best New Director Nomination - 6th Chinese Film Media Awards
Official Selection - 17th Tokyo International Film Festival
Official Selection - 2006 Thessaloniki International Film Festival
Official Selection - 2006 Hawaii International Film Festival

References

External links 
 
 
 
 Official "Waiting Alone" Site
Official "Waiting Alone" Site
Dayyan Eng Biography & Filmography
 Xia Yu Official Site
 Gong Beibi Official Site
 Li Bingbing Official Site

2004 films
2004 romantic comedy films
2000s Mandarin-language films
Films set in Beijing
Chinese romantic comedy films